Bhongolwethu Jayiya (born 21 March 1990 in Soweto, Gauteng) is a South African football (soccer) player who plays as a winger. Jayiya was educated at Potchefstroom High School for Boys which over the years has produced numerous internationally acclaimed sportsmen.

References

External links

1990 births
South African soccer players
Living people
Association football forwards
Bidvest Wits F.C. players
Maritzburg United F.C. players
Mpumalanga Black Aces F.C. players
Cape Town City F.C. (2016) players
Kaizer Chiefs F.C. players
South African Premier Division players
Sportspeople from Soweto
Association football midfielders
2011 CAF U-23 Championship players